Peter Roth is the name of:

 Peter Roth (alpine skier) (born 1961), German former alpine skier
 Peter Roth (executive), president of Warner Bros
 Peter Roth (musician) (born 1974), Israeli musician
 Peter Roth (Medal of Honor), Medal of Honor recipient during the Indian Wars
 Peter Roth (judge) (born 1952), judge of the High Court of England and Wales
 Peter Roth (actor) (born 1955), Swedish actor in Songs from the Second Floor and Vägen ut